Varvara Borisovna Barysheva (born 24 March 1977) is a Russian speed skater who won a bronze medal in the women's team pursuit at the 2006 Winter Olympics.

References

External links
 

1977 births
Russian female speed skaters
Speed skaters at the 1998 Winter Olympics
Speed skaters at the 2002 Winter Olympics
Speed skaters at the 2006 Winter Olympics
Olympic speed skaters of Russia
Medalists at the 2006 Winter Olympics
Olympic medalists in speed skating
Olympic bronze medalists for Russia
Living people